See You in Hell, My Darling is a 1999 Greek dramatic experimental independent underground art film directed by Nikos Nikolaidis. It was officially selected for screening at the Brussels International Film Festival in January 1999 where it was nominated for the Crystal Star and at the Chicago International Film Festival in October 1999 where it was nominated for the Gold Hugo.

Plot
The film is about a pair of women, Vera and Elsa, who rob a van with Elsa's husband. The women are in love with the same man and are also in a relationship with each other.

Cast
Vicky Harris as Elsa
Valeria Christodoulidou as Vera
Paschalis Tsarouhas as Elsa's Husband Dead Man
Nikos Kordinos	as Security Guard
Panos Vourlamis as Security Guard

Further reading
Mikela Fotiou, "Monstrous Women and the Subversion of Patriarchy in Nikos Nikolaidis’s Films Singapore Sling and See You in Hell, My Darling," Sixth Global Conference, 2014, "Evil, Women and the Feminine," Friday, 2 May 2014 – Sunday, 4 May 2014, Lisbon, Portugal, Sunday, 4 May 2014, 14:00, Ninth Session: "It’s Show Time!" Chair: Roger Davis.

External links
See You in Hell, My Darling at Nikos Nikolaidis (Film Director/Writer/Producer)

See You in Hell, My Darling at the Greek Film Archive Film Museum: Home Page, Digital Archives, Filmography
See You in Hell, My Darling at 5 Books, 6 Films, and... Nikos Nikolaidis: Films

See You in Hell, My Darling at The New York Times Movies
See You in Hell, My Darling at the TCM Movie Database

1990s avant-garde and experimental films
1999 drama films
1999 independent films
1999 LGBT-related films
1999 films
Female bisexuality in film
1990s business films
Films about death
Films about security and surveillance
Films directed by Nikos Nikolaidis
Films set in Greece
Films shot in Greece
Greek drama films
1990s Greek-language films
Greek LGBT-related films
LGBT-related drama films
Women and death
Greek avant-garde and experimental films